Dudipatsar Lake, also known as Dudipat Lake, is a lake encircled by snow clad peaks in Lulusar-Dudipatsar National Park. The lake lies in the north end of the Kaghan Valley, in the Mansehra District, Khyber Pakhtunkhwa province, in northern Pakistan.

Geography

Their natural habitat is in the Western Himalayan alpine shrub and meadows ecoregion. 

Lulusar Lake, also in the park, is the primary headwaters of the Kunhar River.

Wildlife
The lake and its wetlands habitats are of significant ecological importance for resident fauna and migratory waterfowl. Some of the park's fauna includes the snow leopard, black bear, marmot, weasel, lynx, leopard, Himalayan snowcock, and snow partridge.

Access
The 2005 Kashmir earthquake in North Pakistan made access more difficult. However, since 2006 the Pakistan government has taken steps to restore tourism in the Kaghan Valley, including rebuilding and new tourism facilities and infrastructure.

See also
Pyala Lake
Dudipatsar Trail
Babusar Pass
Kaghan Valley
List of lakes in Pakistan
List of national parks of Pakistan

References

External links 

Lakes of Khyber Pakhtunkhwa
Mansehra District